Once More! Charlie Byrd's Bossa Nova is an album by American jazz guitarist Charlie Byrd featuring tracks recorded in 1963 and  released on the Riverside label.

Reception

Allmusic awarded the album 2 stars.

Track listing
All compositions by Charlie Byrd except as indicated
 "Outra Vez (Once More)" (Antonio Carlos Jobim) - 3:16     
 "Presente de Natal (Birthday Gift)" (Nelcy Noronha) - 3:29     
 "Insensatez (Insensitive)" (Jobim, Vinícius de Moraes) - 2:58     
 "Three Note Samba" - 2:23     
 "Samba de Minha Terra (Samba of My Country)" (Dorival Caymmi) - 2:03     
 "Limehouse Blues" (Philip Braham, Douglas Furber) - 3:02     
 "Saudade da Bahia (Longing for Bahia)" (Caymmi) - 2:27     
 "Anna" (Roman Vatro, Francesco Giordano) - 4:42     
 "Socegadamente (Softly)" - 2:42     
 "Chega de Saudade (No More Blues)" (Jobim, de Moraes) - 3:16     
 "Canção de Ninar Para Carol (Lullaby for Carol)" - 4:22

Personnel 
Charlie Byrd - guitar
Gene Byrd - guitar, bass
Keter Betts - bass 
Buddy Deppenschmidt, Bill Reichenbach - drums, percussion
Hal Posey - trumpet, flugelhorn (tracks 2, 5, 8 & 11)
Tommy Gwaltney - vibraphone (tracks 2, 5, 8 & 11)
Samuel Ramsey - French horn (tracks 1, 3, 4, 7, 9 & 10)
Morris Kirshbaum, John Martin, Dorothy Stahl, Franz Vlashek - cello (tracks 1, 3, 4, 7, 9 & 10)

References 

1963 albums
Charlie Byrd albums
Riverside Records albums
Albums produced by Orrin Keepnews